Charles Throsby (1777 – 2 April 1828) was an English surgeon who, after he migrated to New South Wales in 1802, became an explorer, pioneer and parliamentarian.  He opened up much new land beyond the Blue Mountains for colonial settlement.

Early life 

Throsby was born in Glenfield near Leicester in England.  He was engaged as a surgeon on the convict transport Coromandel carrying 136 male convicts from Portsmouth to Sydney.  They departed Portsmouth 12 February 1802, and arrived in Sydney without calling in port on 13 June 1802, with no reported convict deaths under his care.

Soon afterwards he joined the medical staff of the Colony, and in October 1802 he was appointed a magistrate and acting-surgeon at Castle Hill. In August 1804 he was transferred to Newcastle, and in April 1805 was made superintendent there. Towards the end of 1808 he was given a grant of 500 acres (2 km²) at Cabramatta, and in the following year resigned his position at Newcastle. In 1811 he was employed as agent by the colony's wealthiest landowner, Sir John Jamison, of Regentville.

Exploration 

In 1817, Throsby did some exploration near Moss Vale and Sutton Forest.

On 8 March 1818, with James Meehan, he set out to discover a route to Jervis Bay, and about three weeks later — the party having been split up — Throsby's section reached Jervis Bay by way of the Kangaroo and Lower Shoalhaven rivers.  Determining that he had no hope of finding his way to his intended destination, he couldn't decide whether to keep going or head back.  A pair of aborigines helped him get through the valley by way of Meryla Pass.

On 25 April 1819 Throsby pioneered exploration west of the Blue Mountains, when he left the Cowpastures (near the present day Camden), and travelling first south-south-west, then west, north-west, and north-north-west, finished his journey near the site of Bathurst. Macquarie stated in a dispatch that "the rich fertile country passed over by Mr Throsby . . . will be fully equal to meet every increase of the population . . . for many years". Throsby himself was given a grant of land near Moss Vale at Bong Bong. Throsby undertook the journey with John Rowley, two servants John Wait and Joe Wild, and two Aboriginal guides, named Cookoogong and Dual.

He was put in charge of the construction of a road to the Goulburn plains and in August of that year two of his men reached Lake George. In October Governor Macquarie visited this district with Throsby, and while he was there Throsby and two other men made further explorations. The details of this trip are lost, but it is probable that Throsby passed through what is now the Australian Capital Territory and that he reached the Yass River. On 20 March 1821 Throsby with two companions made an expedition to reach the Murrumbidgee River, having heard of its existence from the aborigines. Coming first to the Molonglo River he probably discovered the Murrumbidgee below Tuggeranong, near Pine Island early in April 1821.

Legislative Council 

In November 1824 Throsby was one of the 10 landholders and merchants submitted by Governor Brisbane to Earl Bathurst as suitable for appointment for a colonial council, and when the New South Wales Legislative Council was formed in December 1825, three of these were appointed, of whom Throsby was one.

Legal action and death 

In about 1811 Throsby had become security for the purchase of a vessel by a friend, Garnham Blaxcell, who had left the colony in 1817 and subsequently died. Proceedings were taken against Throsby which became drawn out, and eventually a verdict against him was obtained for £4000. His health had not been good for some time, and becoming depressed, on 2 April 1828 he committed suicide by shooting himself.

Charles Throsby had no children, and his estate was inherited by his nephew, Charles Throsby. He had previously been sent for and arrived on the Mangles on 7 August 1820. The nephew and his family prospered in the Moss Vale area. He married Elizabeth "Betsey" Broughton, one of the survivors of the 1809 Boyd massacre, and had many children. Throsby Park in Moss Vale was occupied by five generations of the family.

Legacy 

Throsby is commemorated in the name of the Commonwealth Electoral Division of Throsby, in the Canberra suburb of Throsby and Throsby Creek in Newcastle, New South Wales.

References

1777 births
1828 deaths
Explorers of Australia
Members of the New South Wales Legislative Council
People from Glenfield, Leicestershire
Suicides by firearm in Australia
Glenfield, New South Wales